Wong Pei Tty (born 11 November 1981) is a former doubles badminton player from Malaysia. Currently, she works as an assistant coach for Malaysia women's double national team.

Career 
Wong competed in badminton at the 2004 Summer Olympics in women's doubles with partner Chin Eei Hui. They defeated Seiko Yamada and Shizuka Yamamoto of Japan in the first round but were defeated by Gao Ling and Huang Sui of China in the round of 16. Together, Wong and Chin achieved much success by winning Superseries and Superseries Finals titles. They also clinched gold and bronze medals in 2010 and 2002 Commonwealth Games. Although not well known as a mixed doubles player, Wong created history for Malaysia as the only female player to have won a medal in mixed doubles at the World Championships and Asian Games in the same year (2006), with different partners.

Achievements

World Championships 
Mixed doubles

World Cup 
Women's doubles

Commonwealth Games 
Women's doubles

Asian Games 
Mixed doubles

Asian Championships 
Women's doubles

Mixed doubles

Southeast Asian Games 
Women's doubles

Mixed doubles

BWF Superseries 
The BWF Superseries, launched on 14 December 2006 and implemented in 2007, is a series of elite badminton tournaments, sanctioned by Badminton World Federation (BWF). BWF Superseries has two level such as Superseries and Superseries Premier. A season of Superseries features twelve tournaments around the world, which introduced since 2011, with successful players invited to the Superseries Finals held at the year end.

Women's doubles

  BWF Superseries Finals tournament
  BWF Superseries Premier tournament
  BWF Superseries tournament

BWF Grand Prix 
The BWF Grand Prix had two levels, the BWF Grand Prix and Grand Prix Gold. It was a series of badminton tournaments sanctioned by the Badminton World Federation (BWF) which was held from 2007 to 2017. The World Badminton Grand Prix sanctioned by International Badminton Federation (IBF) from 1983 to 2006.

Women's doubles

Mixed doubles

  BWF Grand Prix Gold tournament
  IBF & BWF Grand Prix tournament

IBF International 
Women's doubles

Mixed doubles

References

External links 
 

1981 births
Living people
People from Ipoh
Malaysian sportspeople of Chinese descent
Malaysian female badminton players
Badminton players at the 2004 Summer Olympics
Badminton players at the 2008 Summer Olympics
Olympic badminton players of Malaysia
Badminton players at the 2002 Asian Games
Badminton players at the 2006 Asian Games
Asian Games bronze medalists for Malaysia
Asian Games medalists in badminton
Medalists at the 2006 Asian Games
Badminton players at the 2002 Commonwealth Games
Badminton players at the 2006 Commonwealth Games
Commonwealth Games gold medallists for Malaysia
Commonwealth Games bronze medallists for Malaysia
Commonwealth Games medallists in badminton
Competitors at the 2001 Southeast Asian Games
Competitors at the 2003 Southeast Asian Games
Competitors at the 2005 Southeast Asian Games
Competitors at the 2007 Southeast Asian Games
Competitors at the 2009 Southeast Asian Games
Southeast Asian Games gold medalists for Malaysia
Southeast Asian Games bronze medalists for Malaysia
Southeast Asian Games medalists in badminton
World No. 1 badminton players
Badminton coaches
Medallists at the 2002 Commonwealth Games
Medallists at the 2006 Commonwealth Games